The name Jerry has been used for six Tropical cyclones in the Atlantic Ocean:

 Hurricane Jerry (1989) – crossed over the Yucatán Peninsula and also struck Texas, killing three and causing $70 million in damages
 Tropical Storm Jerry (1995) – formed between Florida and the Bahamas, caused six deaths and $26.5 million in damages in the southeast United States
 Tropical Storm Jerry (2001) – passed south of Barbados and dissipated in the Caribbean Sea
 Tropical Storm Jerry (2007) – formed in the northern central Atlantic and stayed far from land
 Tropical Storm Jerry (2013) – formed and remained far from land
 Hurricane Jerry (2019) – Category 2 hurricane that never affected land

Atlantic hurricane set index articles